Beaver Brook may refer to several places:

Canada
Beaver Brook, New Brunswick, in Albert County
Beaver Brook Station, New Brunswick, or Beaverbrook, in Northumberland County 
Beaver Brook, Nova Scotia
Beaver Brook Estates, Alberta
Beaver Brook Park, Alberta

United States
Beaver Brook, Wisconsin, a town in Washburn County
Beaver Brook (community), Wisconsin
Beaver Brook Association nature center, in New Hampshire
Beaver Brook Falls, in Colebrook, New Hampshire
Beaver Brook Reservation, a state park in Belmont and Waltham, Massachusetts
Beaver Brook State Park, in Connecticut
Beaver Brook (Connecticut), a stream
Beaver Brook (Merrimack River tributary), in New Hampshire and Massachusetts
Beaver Brook (Mohawk River tributary), in New York
Beaver Brook (New Jersey), a tributary of the Pequest River 
Beaver Brook station (closed), in Waltham, Massachusetts

See also

Beaverbrook (disambiguation)
Beaver Creek (disambiguation)
Beaver River (disambiguation)